Helcion is a genus of sea snails, true limpets, marine gastropod mollusks in the family Patellidae.

Species
Species within the genus Helcion include:

Subgenus Ansates : accepted as Ansates G.B. Sowerby II [ex Klein], 1839
 Helcion pellucidum - Blue-rayed limpet : accepted as Ansates pellucida (Linnaeus, 1758)
 Helcion tella

Subgenus Helcion
 Helcion pectunculus (Gmelin, 1791)

Subgenus Patinastra
 Helcion dunkeri (Krauss, 1848)
 Helcion pruinosus (Krauss, 1848)

subgenus ?
 Helcion concolor (Krauss, 1848)

References

External links

Patellidae